The Wild Creatures and Forest Laws Act 1971 (c 47) is an Act of the Parliament of the United Kingdom. The Act implemented recommendations contained in the second report on statute law revision, by the Law Commission.

Provisions
Section 1(1) repealed the longest standing statute in England, the Charter of the Forest 1217, by abolishing “any prerogative right of Her Majesty to wild creatures (except royal fish and swans) together with any prerogative right to set aside land or water for the breeding, support or taking of wild creatures; and any franchises of forest, free chase, park or free warren.” This preserves Crown rights of ownership over royal fish (whales and sturgeons) and mute swans.

In section 2(3), the words from "and" onwards were repealed by section 41(1) of, and Part I of Schedule 6 to, the Northern Ireland Constitution Act 1973.

See also
English land law
UK environmental law
Charter of the Forest 1217

Notes

References
Halsbury's Statutes

External links
The Wild Creatures and Forest Laws Act 1971, as amended, from the National Archives.

United Kingdom Acts of Parliament 1971
English forest law